Aukusti Eronen (21 August 1875, Rantasalmi – 15 November 1935) was a Finnish farmer and politician. He served as a Member of the Parliament of Finland from 1908 to 1909 and again from 1910 to 1911, representing the Finnish Party.

References

1875 births
1935 deaths
People from Rantasalmi
People from Mikkeli Province (Grand Duchy of Finland)
Finnish Party politicians
Members of the Parliament of Finland (1908–09)
Members of the Parliament of Finland (1910–11)
Finnish farmers